The DRG Class 99.17, formerly the Württemberg Ts 4 of the Royal Württemberg State Railways were German narrow gauge steam locomotives bought for working the 15.11 kilometre long route between the towns of Altensteig and Nagold. The three tank locomotives had an outer frame and a Klose drive. The first and third axles were steered by the third, radially-sliding axle by means of a system of levers. The second axle was driven by the inside cylinder and had no wheel flanges. Overall the system was very reliable, but nevertheless also very maintenance-intensive.

The engines were delivered in 1891, 1892 and 1899, and later all taken over by the Reichsbahn. There they were given numbers 99 171–99 173. They also had the names Altensteig, Berneck and Ebhausen

See also
Royal Württemberg State Railways
List of Württemberg locomotives and railbuses

References

0-8-0T locomotives
Narrow gauge steam locomotives of Germany
Metre gauge steam locomotives
Ts 4
Esslingen locomotives
Railway locomotives introduced in 1891
D n2t locomotives
Freight locomotives